Météo may refer to:
Weather in French
 Météo-France, the French national meteorological service
 MétéoMédia, a 24-hour Canadian French-language cable television specialty channel and web site
 Météo Suisse, officially the Federal Office of Meteorology and Climatology, an office of the federal administration of Switzerland
 Météo+, a Canadian television sitcom
 Miss Météo, a Canadian Quebec French-language television series